Carol Anne Haley (born 27 January 1972) is a Canadian politician, who represented the district of Burin-Grand Bank in the Newfoundland and Labrador House of Assembly from 2015 until 2021.

Haley was elected in the 2015 provincial election. She served as chief government whip in the House of Assembly.

On November 8, 2018, Haley was promoted to cabinet as Minister Responsible for the Status of Women.

She was re-elected in the 2019 provincial election defeating former MHA and MP Bill Matthews.

On August 14, 2020 Haley announced she would not be seeking re-election and would resign as Status of Women Minister when the incoming Furey government was sworn in on August 19, 2020.

Prior to her election to the legislature, Haley was a special assistant to federal Member of Parliament Judy Foote.

References

1972 births
Living people
Liberal Party of Newfoundland and Labrador MHAs
Members of the Executive Council of Newfoundland and Labrador
Women government ministers of Canada
Women MHAs in Newfoundland and Labrador
People from Grand Bank
21st-century Canadian politicians
21st-century Canadian women politicians
People from Fortune, Newfoundland and Labrador